John W. Tait (born 1945) is a British Edwards Professor of Egyptology at the Institute of Archaeology, University College London, and was the head of the department till 2010. He received his Ph.D in Egyptian and Greek Papyrology from the University of Oxford. His research focuses on Ancient Egyptian literature, including documents written in hieroglyphs, hieratic, Demotic, and Greek. He has also worked as a member of the Project for the Publication of the Carlsberg Papyri and the Egypt Exploration Society.

See also
 List of Egyptologists

Notes

References
Tait, John W. (2003). 'Never Had the Like Occurred': Egypt's View of Its Past. Edited by John W. Tait. London: University College London, Institute of Archaeology, an imprint of Cavendish Publishing Limited. .

British Egyptologists
Academics of the UCL Institute of Archaeology
Academics of University College London
Living people
1945 births